Deborah Biancotti is an Australian writer of speculative fiction.

Biography
Biancotti was born in 1971 in Cairns, Queensland, Australia. Her first work was published in 2000 with her short story "The First and Final Game" which was featured in Altair and won the 2000 Aurealis Award for best horror short story. In 2001 she won the Ditmar Award for best new talent. Biancotti's fifth short story, "King of All and the Metal Sentinel" was published in 2002 and won the 2003 Ditmar Award for best Australian short fiction. In 2007 her story "A Scar for Leida" won the Aurealis Award for best young-adult short story. Biancotti is now based in Sydney.

Awards and nominations

Bibliography

Short fiction
"The First and Final Game" (2000) in Altair #6/7 (ed. Robert N. Stephenson, Jim Deed, Andrew Collings)
"All the Monochrome Butterflies" (2001) in Mitch?2: Tarts of the New Millennium"Fixing the Glitch" (2001) in Mitch?3: Hacks to the Max"Life's Work" (2002) in Passing Strange (ed. Bill Congreve)
"The Razor Salesman" (2002) in Ideomancer Unbound (ed. Chris Clarke, Mikal Trimm)
"Silicon Cast" (2002) in Redsine Seven (ed. Garry Nurrish)
"King of All and the Metal Sentinel" (2002) in Agog! Fantastic Fiction (ed. Cat Sparks)
"The Distance Keeper" (2003) in Borderlands No. 1
"The Singular Life of Eddy Dovewater" (2003) in Agog! Terrific Tales (ed. Cat Sparks)
"Stone by Stone" (2003) in Southern Blood: New Australian Tales of the Supernatural (ed. Bill Congreve)
"Number 3 Raw Place" (2004) in Agog! Smashing Stories (ed. Cat Sparks)
"Cinnamon Gate" (2004) in Orb Speculative Fiction No. 6 (ed. Sarah Endacott)
"Syrup" (2005) in ConSensual a Trois (ed. Cathy Cupitt, Stephen Dedman, Elaine Kemp)
"Six of One" (2005) in Mitch? 4: Slow Dancing Through Quicksand"Summa Seltzer Missive" (2005) in Ticonderoga Online No. 6 (ed. Russell B. Farr, Liz Grzyb, Lyn Battersby)
"Surrender I: Rope Artist" (2006) in Shadowed Realms (ed. Angela Challis, Shane Jiraiya Cummings)
"Stealing Free" (2006) in Agog! Ripping Reads (ed. Cat Sparks)
"The Dying Light" (2006) in Eidolon I (ed. Jeremy G. Byrne, Jonathan Strahan)
"A Scar for Leida" (2007) in Fantastic Wonder Stories (ed. Russell B. Farr)
"The Tailor of Time" (2008) in Clockwork Phoenix (ed. Mike Allen)
"Conversations" (2008) in Dog Versus Sandwich (ed. Ben Payne)
"Watertight Lies" (2008) in 2012 (ed. Alisa Krasnostein, Ben Payne)
"The Tailor of Time" (2008) in Clockwork Phoenix (ed. Mike Allen)
"Pale Dark Soldier" (2008) in Midnight Echo (ed. Kirstyn McDermitt, Ian Mond)
"Seven Ages of the Protagonist" (2008) in Scary Food (ed. Cat Sparks)
"Coming Up for Air" (2009) in A Book of Endings (ed. Alisa Krasnostein, Ben Payne)
"Diamond Shell" (2009) in A Book of Endings (ed. Alisa Krasnostein, Ben Payne)
"This Time, Longing" (2009) in A Book of Endings (ed. Alisa Krasnostein, Ben Payne)
"Six Suicides" (2009) in A Book of Endings (ed. Alisa Krasnostein, Ben Payne)
"Problems of Light and Dark" (2009) in A Book of Endings (ed. Alisa Krasnostein, Ben Payne)
"Hush" (2009) in A Book of Endings (ed. Alisa Krasnostein, Ben Payne)
"And the Dead Shall Outnumber the Living" (2010) in Ishtar (ed. Mark Deniz)
"Home Turf" (2010) in Baggage (ed. Gillian Polack)
"No Going Home" (2010) in Sprawl (ed. Alisa Krasnostein)
"All the Lost Ones" (2013) in Exotic Gothic 5, Vol. I (ed. Danel Olson)

CollectionsA Book of Endings (2009)Bad Power (2011)

NovellaWaking in Winter (2016)

NovelsZeroes'' (2015) (co-authored with Scott Westerfeld and Margo Lanagan)

References
General
Bibliography at Deborahbiancotti.net

Specific

External links
Official site

1971 births
Living people
Australian fantasy writers
Australian science fiction writers
Australian horror writers
Women science fiction and fantasy writers
Women horror writers
Australian women short story writers